Aviastroitelnaya is a station on the Kazan Metro that opened on 9 May 2013. It was part of the northern extension of the Kazan Metro along with Yashlek and Severny Vokzal that opened on 9 May 2013.

References

Kazan Metro
Railway stations in Russia opened in 2013
Railway stations located underground in Russia